Jerzy Jurowicz (21 May 1920 – 19 October 1989) was a Polish footballer. He played in eight matches for the Poland national football team from 1947 to 1950.

References

External links
 

1920 births
1989 deaths
Burials at Rakowicki Cemetery
Polish footballers
Poland international footballers
Place of birth missing
Association football goalkeepers